The 2012 Samsung Securities Cup was a professional tennis tournament played on hard courts. It was the 13th edition of the tournament which was part of the 2012 ATP Challenger Tour and the 2012 ITF Women's Circuit. It took place in Seoul, Korea between 22 and 28 October 2012.

ATP main-draw entrants

Seeds

 1 Rankings are as of October 15, 2012.

Other entrants
The following players received wildcards into the singles main draw:
  Chung Hy-Eon
  Jeong Suk-Young
  Nam Ji-Sung
  Nam Hyun-woo

The following players received entry from the qualifying draw:
  Lim Yong-Kyu
  Matwé Middelkoop
  Na Jung-Woong
  Divij Sharan

WTA main-draw entrants

Seeds

 1 Rankings are as of October 15, 2012.

Other entrants
The following players received wildcards into the singles main draw:
  Han Na-Lae
  Kang Seo-Kyung
  Lee Jin-a
  Song Ah

The following players received entry from the qualifying draw:
  Choi Ji-Hee
  Kim Hae-Sung
  Kim Na-Ri
  Lee Ye-Rin
  Napatsakorn Sankaew
  Trang Huynh Phuong Dai
  Varunya Wongteanchai
  Yea Hyo-Jung

Champions

Men's singles

 Lu Yen-hsun def.  Yūichi Sugita, 6–3, 7–6(7–4)

Women's singles

 Erika Sema def.  Mai Minokoshi, 6–1, 7–5

Men's doubles

 Lee Hsin-han /  Peng Hsien-yin def.  Lim Yong-Kyu /  Nam Ji-Sung, 7–6(7–3), 7–5

Women's doubles

 Nigina Abduraimova /  Chan Wing-yau def.  Kim Ji-Young /  Yoo Mi, 6–4, 2–6, [12–10]

External links
Official Website

Samsung Securities Cup
Samsung Securities Cup
Samsung Securities Cup
Samsung